Claudia Lennear (born Claudia Joy Offley; 1946) is an American soul singer and educator. Lennear began her performing with the Superbs before becoming an Ikette in the Ike & Tina Turner Revue. She was also a background vocalist for various acts, including Joe Cocker, Leon Russell, and Freddie King. She released her only solo album in 1973. Lennear was featured in the 2013 Oscar-winning documentary 20 Feet from Stardom. She was inducted in the Rhode Island Music Hall of Fame in 2019.

Early life 
Lennear was born Claudia Joy Offley at Providence Lying-In Hospital in Rhode Island. Her last name was changed after her mother married Leo V. Lennear, a Navy man stationed in Newport. She grew up in different neighborhoods in Providence. Although raised a Catholic, her grandmother taught her to sing gospel songs as a child.

In elementary school, Lennear studied music theory and took French at St. Charles Borromeo parochial school. Her career goal was to become a translator at the United Nations. She also took private piano lessons. In high school, she was in the chorale program. As a teenager she listened to Patti LaBelle & the Bluebelles, Gladys Knight & the Pips, Carla Thomas, and Ike & Tina Turner. During her senior year at Hope High School, her stepfather retired from the Navy and she moved to Pomona, California with her family in 1964.

Career 
After graduating from high school, Lennear enrolled in college and began fronting the Los Angeles-based soul group the Superbs. They performed local gigs around Los Angeles. Lennear made her recording debut with the group on the single "One Bad Habit," released on Doré Records in 1968.

The Ikettes 
Through her friend, singer Sherlie Matthews, Lennear landed an audition with bandleader Ike Turner in 1968. She passed the audition and left the Superbs to become an Ikette. "He [Ike Turner] was a terrific business person, very disciplined, and he was a visionary," she said. Lennear was with Ike & Tina Turner for a few years until she had a spat with Tina Turner. However, Lennear recalls her time with the Turners fondly, telling The Providence Journal: "Without Ike and Tina, I'd probably be 20 miles from stardom, not 20 feet....they taught me how to perform, how to work with other singers and musicians. Ike taught me how to support Tina on stage. And Tina taught me how to present myself....During the three years I was an Ikette, I never witnessed any physical abuse."

Post-Ikette career 
After leaving the Ikettes in 1970, Lennear worked with many acts including Humble Pie and Joe Cocker. She was part of a trio of backup singers for Delaney and Bonnie, that also included Rita Coolidge.

Lennear was one of Leon Russell's Shelter People. She sang back-up vocals on Joe Cocker's 1970 Mad Dogs and Englishmen tour and live album, on Leon Russell and the Shelter People, released in 1971 and on George Harrison's The Concert for Bangla Desh. Her lead vocal live recording of "Let It Be" from the Mad Dogs and Englishmen movie was the B side of Leon Russell's "Mad Dogs and Englishmen" single on A&M Records in 1971.

In 1973, Lennear released her first and only solo album for Warner Bros. Records entitled Phew!. She had a bit part in the 1974 film Thunderbolt and Lightfoot, playing the secretary who asks Clint Eastwood's character for his Social Security number. Lennear appeared in the August 1974 issue of Playboy magazine in a pictorial entitled "Brown Sugar."

Lennear appeared in the Academy Award-winning documentary 20 Feet from Stardom (2013), which premiered at the Sundance Film Festival. After the success of the film, David Bowie contacted Lennear and offered to write songs for her next project.

Since 2014, Lennear has performed and recorded in Los Angeles with The New Ash Grove Players with S S Jones & Claudia Lennear. They have performed at the McCabes Guitar Shop, The Coffee Gallery, the Pasadena Pavilion for the Performing Arts, and The Improv At the Lockn' Festival on September 11, 2015, Lennear performed with the Tedeschi Trucks Band, Rita Coolidge, Leon Russell and other alumni from the 1970 Joe Cocker Mad Dogs and Englishmen Tour in a memorial concert for Cocker.

Academic career 
Lennear received degrees in French literature and art history from Pitzer College. She began teaching first in high school and then at Mt. San Antonio College, where she teaches French, Spanish, English and remedial math.

Accolades 
In 2019, Lennear was inducted in the Rhode Island Music Hall of Fame.

Personal life 
In 1969, Lennear dated Mick Jagger when Ike & Tina Turner were the opening act for the Rolling Stones on their American tour. Lennear's relationships with Mick Jagger and David Bowie are often cited as inspiration for The Rolling Stones' "Brown Sugar" (1971) and Bowie's "Lady Grinning Soul" (1973). NME editors Roy Carr and Charles Shaar Murray noted in 1981 that she was "yet to reply in song to either Mick or David." However, in a 1973 article in Rolling Stone, she was quoted as saying that she wrote the song "Not At All" "to inform Mick Jagger of his dispensability".

Discography

Singles

Albums

As a solo artist

As an Ikette

With other artists

Filmography/TV appearances

References

External links
 Official Website
Claudia Lennear on AllMusic
 Singer Claudia Lennear aka the Rolling Stones' famous Brown Sugar; audio clip from Robert Elms, With Jason Solomons, Claudia Lennear, Louisa Pestell and Dr. Robert, BBC London, February 20, 2014

1946 births
Living people
American women singers
Ike & Tina Turner members
African-American women singers
Schoolteachers from Rhode Island
American women educators
A&M Records artists
Warner Records artists
American rhythm and blues singers
American women songwriters
American soul singers
Singers from Rhode Island
Muses
African-American women singer-songwriters
Songwriters from Rhode Island
Singers from Los Angeles
People from Pomona, California
Musicians from Providence, Rhode Island
Singer-songwriters from California